Brychius pacificus is a species of beetle in the genus Brychius that was discovered in 1928.

References

Beetles described in 1928
Haliplidae